Jan Abaza and Viktorija Golubic were the defending champions, but Golubic chose not to participate. Abaza partnered Alyona Sotnikova, but they lost in the quarterfinals.

Michaëlla Krajicek and Taylor Townsend won the title, defeating Sabrina Santamaria and Keri Wong in the final, 3–6, 6–2, [10–6].

Seeds

Draw

References 
 Draw

Tennis Classic of Macon - Doubles